Litherland is an area to the north of Liverpool in Sefton, Merseyside, England.  It contains five buildings that are recorded in the National Heritage List for England as designated listed buildings, all of which are listed at Grade II.  This grade is the lowest of the three gradings given to listed buildings and is applied to "buildings of national importance and special interest".  The area is almost completely residential, and the listed buildings consist of two churches, a Methodist mission, a former Sunday school, and a farmhouse.


References

Citations

Sources

Listed buildings in Merseyside
Lists of listed buildings in Merseyside